Tarleton is a civil parish in the West Lancashire district of Lancashire, England.  It contains 19 buildings that are recorded in the National Heritage List for England as designated listed buildings.  Of these, one is at Grade II*, the middle grade, and the others are at Grade II, the lowest grade.  The parish contains the village of Tarleton, the hamlets of Holmes, Mere Brow and Sollom, and surrounding countryside.  The Rufford Branch of the Leeds and Liverpool Canal and the River Douglas pass through the parish, and bridges crossing these are listed.  The other listed buildings include farmhouses, farm buildings, other houses, a medieval cross base, a church, a war memorial, and a canal warehouse.


Key

Buildings

References

Citations

Sources

Lists of listed buildings in Lancashire
Buildings and structures in the Borough of West Lancashire